The Lesotho Independence Cup is an annual knockout football competition in men's domestic football in Lesotho.

Winners

Sturrock Cup
1963 : Bantu FC (Matefeng) 
1976 : Matlama FC (Maseru)
1978 : Maseru United
1979 : Matlama FC (Maseru)
1980 : Matlama FC (Maseru)
1981 : Maseru Rovers
1982 : Maseru Rovers
1983 : Linare FC (Leribe)
1984 : Lioli FC (Teyateyaneng)

Independence Cup (Top 4)
1985 : Lesotho Paramilitary Forces (Maseru)
1986 : RLDF (Maseru)  
1987 : Matlama FC (Maseru)
1988 : RLDF (Maseru)
1989 : Arsenal (Maseru)
1990 : RLDF (Maseru)
1991 : Arsenal (Maseru)
1992 : Matlama FC (Maseru)
1993 : Bantu FC (Mafeteng)
1994 : Matlama FC (Maseru)
1995 : Maseru Rovers
1996 : Lerotholi Polytechnic
1997 : Bantu FC (Mafeteng)    
1998 : Arsenal (Maseru)
1999 : Linare FC (Leribe)
2000 : RLDF (Maseru)
2001–04        not played
2005 :  LCS (Maseru)
2006 :  Likhopo (Maseru)            and Lioli FC (Teyateyaneng)  [match abandoned due to crowd trouble]
2007 :  Lioli FC (Teyateyaneng) 3–1 LDF (Maseru) 
2008 :  LMPS (Maseru)               0–0 Lioli FC (Teyateyaneng)  [3–1 pen]
2009 :  LMPS (Maseru) 
2010 :  Lioli FC (Teyateyaneng)    
2011 :  Bantu FC (Mafeteng)            3–1 LCS (Maseru)
2012 :  Bantu FC (Mafeteng)            2–2 LCS (Maseru)             [4–3 pen]
2013 :  Bantu FC (Mafeteng)            1–1 Lioli FC (Teyateyaneng)  [4–3 pen]
2014 :  Lioli FC (Teyateyaneng)    1–1 Matlama FC (Maseru)  [12–11 pen]
2015 :  Bantu FC (Mafeteng)        1–1 Lioli FC (Teyateyaneng) [15–14 pen]
2016 :  Lioli FC (Teyateyaneng)    1–0 Matlama FC (Maseru)
2017 :  Bantu FC (Mafeteng)        1-1 LCS (Maseru)             [3-1 pen]
2018 :  Lioli FC (Teyateyaneng)        2-1 Bantu FC (Mafeteng)
2019 :  Matlama FC (Maseru)        1-0 LCS (Maseru)

References

Football competitions in Lesotho
National association football cups